Diaolou are fortified multi-storey watchtowers in rural villages, generally made of reinforced concrete. These towers are located mainly in the Kaiping county of Jiangmen prefecture in Guangdong province, China. In 2007, UNESCO designated the Kaiping Diaolou and Villages a World Heritage Site, which covers four separate Kaiping village areas: Sanmenli, Zilicun, Jinjiangli, and Majianglong village cluster. These areas demonstrate a unique fusion of 19th and 20th-century Chinese and Western architectural styles.

History
Diaolou structures were built from the time of the Ming Dynasty to the early 20th century, reaching a peak during the Warlord Era in the 1920s and 1930s, with the financial aid of overseas Chinese, when there were more than three thousand of these structures. Today, approximately 1,800 diaolou remain standing, and mostly abandoned, in the village countryside of Kaiping, and approximately 500 in neighboring Taishan.  They can also occasionally be found in several other areas of Guangdong, such as Shenzhen and Dongguan.

The earliest standing diaolou in Kaiping is Yinglong Lou in the village of Sanmenli (Chikan township), built by the Guan lineage during the reign of Jiajing Emperor of the Ming dynasty (1522–1566). It was a massive three-storey rectangular fortress with one-meter thick walls, with little resemblance with the high tower diaolous built four centuries later.  Yinglong Lou was renovated in 1919 and is 11.4 meters high.

In the late 19th century and early 20th century, because of poverty and social instabilities, Kaiping was a region of major emigration abroad, one of the "pre-eminent sending area" of overseas Chinese.  Diaolous built during the chaotic early 20th century were most numerous around the centers of emigration. Monies from emigrants wanting to ensure the security of their families, villages, or clan lineages were used to fund the diaolou.  Although the diaolous were built mainly as protection against forays by bandits, many of them also served as living quarters.  Some of them were built by a single family, some by several families together or by entire village communities.  Kaiping became also a melting pot of ideas and trends brought back by overseas Chinese. As a result, the villagers built their diaolou to incorporate architectural features from China and from the West.

It wasn't until after 1949 when an administrative system that extended down to the small villages was created that the diaolou lost their defensive purpose and were then abandoned or converted.  Still, they stand as a tribute to overseas Chinese culture and the perseverance of the peasants of Kaiping.

In 2007, UNESCO named the Kaiping Diaolou and Villages a World Heritage Site. UNESCO wrote, "...the Diaolou ... display a complex and flamboyant fusion of Chinese and Western structural and decorative forms. They reflect the significant role of émigré Kaiping people in the development of several countries in South Asia, Australasia, and North America, during the late 19th and early 20th centuries, and the close links between overseas Kaiping and their ancestral homes. The property inscribed here consists of four groups of Diaolou, totaling some 1,800 tower houses in their village settings."  The four restored groups of Kaiping diaolou are in: Zilicun village of Tangkou township, Sanmenli village of Chikan township, Majianglong cluster of Baihe township, and Jinjiangli village of Xiangang township.

The Kaiping diaolou was the location for parts of the filming of 2010 movie Let the Bullets Fly.

Examples
Yinglong Lou, located in the village of Sanmenli (Chikan township), was built by the Guan lineage during the Jiajing era of the Ming dynasty (1522–1566). As the oldest preserved diaolou in Kaiping, it retains the primitive model of a watchtower with traditional square structure and is not influenced by western architectural styles.

Jinjiangli Diaolou Cluster, situated behind Jinjiangli Village (Xiangang Township) of the Huang family, includes three exquisite diaolous: Ruishi Lou, Shengfeng Lou, and Jinjiang Lou. Ruishi Diaolou, constructed in 1921, has nine floors and is the tallest diaolou in Kaiping. It features a Byzantine style roof and a Roman dome.

Majianglong Diaolou cluster is spread across five villages (Baihe township) in a bamboo forest: Yong'an and Nan'an Villages of the Huang family; Hedong, Qinglin, and Longjiang Villages of the Guan family. Tianlu Lou (Tower of Heavenly Success), located in Yong'an Village, was built in 1922 and is seven storey tall plus a roof top floor.

Zilicun Diaolou Cluster, located in Zilicun Village (Tangkou township), includes nine diaolous, the largest number among the four Kaiping villages designated by UNESCO. They feature the fusion of Chinese and various Western architectural styles and rise up surrealistically over the rice paddy fields.

Fangshi Denglou – Built in 1920 after contributions from villagers, this denglou is five stories high. It is referred to as the "Light Tower" because of an enormous searchlight with a brightness much like that of a lighthouse.

Li Garden, in Beiyi Xiang, was constructed in 1936 by Mr. Xie Weili, a Chinese emigrant to the United States.

Bianchouzhu Lou (The Leaning Tower), located in Nanxing Village in Xiangang township, was constructed in 1903. It has seven floors and overlooks a pond.

Gallery

See also
 Cantonese architecture
 Chikan, Kaiping
 Kaiping
 Himalayan Towers

References

External links

 Information about the diaolou
 Kaiping Diaolou and Villages - UNESCO World Heritage Centre
 UNESCO World Heritage Convention: Kaiping Diaolou and Villages

Major National Historical and Cultural Sites in Guangdong
Architecture in China
World Heritage Sites in China
Kaiping
Lingnan architecture
Enping
Taishan, Guangdong